is a private university in Fujisawa, Kanagawa, Japan. The predecessor of the school was founded in 1961. Two years later, it was chartered as a university.

Faculties and Departments

Graduate Schools
Graduate School of Engineering
Mechanical Engineering
Electrical and Information Engineering

External links
 Official website 

Educational institutions established in 1961
Private universities and colleges in Japan
Buildings and structures in Fujisawa, Kanagawa
Universities and colleges in Kanagawa Prefecture
Engineering universities and colleges in Japan
1961 establishments in Japan